Leslie Andrew Garay (August 6, 1924 - August 19, 2016), born Garay László András, was an American botanist. He was the curator of the Oakes Ames Orchid Herbarium at Harvard University, where he succeeded Charles Schweinfurth in 1958.  In 1957 he was awarded a Guggenheim Fellowship.

Life and work
Garay was born in Hungary, and after the Second World War he emigrated first to Canada and then to the United States. He was a taxonomist and collector of orchids, particularly interested in the orchids of tropical America and Southeast Asia.

His ideas were influential in orchid taxonomy, and he reorganized several genera, including Oncidium.  In addition to reclassification of various species into different genera,  he defined a number of new genera including Chaubardiella in 1969 and Amesiella in 1972.

Publications
Among his influential publications were:

 Venezuelan Orchids Illustrated, Galfrid C. K. Dunsterville & Leslie A. Garay, Andre Deutsch, London & Amsterdam, 1959–76, 334 pp. 
 Natural & artificial hybrid generic names of orchids, 1887-1965, 1966, Botanical Museum leaflets, Harvard University, 212 pp.
 Flora of the Lesser Antilles: Orchidaceae , 1974, Garay, Los Angeles, HR Sweet, Amer Orchid Soc.  
 Orchids of the Southern Ryukyu Islands, 1974, Leslie A. Garay & Herman R. Sweet, Botanical Museum, Harvard University, 180 pp. 
 Orchidaceae, Cypripedioideae, Orchidoideae, Neottioideae, vol. 9 of Flora of Ecuador, NFR, 304 pp.
 Orchids Venezuela,  Galfrid C. K. Dunsterville & Leslie A. Garay, 3 volumes, 1979, Publ. Oakes Ames Orchid Herbarium of the Botanical Museum of Harvard University. Cambridge, Massachusetts
 Systematics of the genus Stelis SW, 1979, Harvard University, Botanical Museum leaflets, 259 pp. 
 Index to the orchid herbarium of Oakes Ames in the Botanical Museum of Harvard University, 1989, Chadwyck-Healey, 204 pp.

Legacy 
The following plants have been named in his honour:
 Genera
 (Orchidaceae)  Garayanthus Szlach.
 (Orchidaceae) Garaya Szlach.
 (Orchidaceae)  Lesliea Seidenf.

 Species

References 

Orchidologists
1924 births
2016 deaths
Arnold Arboretum
20th-century American botanists
21st-century American botanists
Harvard University staff
Hungarian emigrants to Canada
Canadian emigrants to the United States